Canbya candida (common names: pygmy poppy, white pygmy poppy) is a tiny, white flowered annual plant in the genus Canbya of the poppy family. It is found in the western Mojave Desert of Southern California.

References

 
 
 
 

Papaveroideae
Endemic flora of California
Flora of the California desert regions
Natural history of the Mojave Desert